This is a list of the albums ranked number one in the United States during 2020. The top-performing albums and EPs in the United States are ranked on the Billboard 200 chart, which is published by Billboard magazine. The data is compiled by Nielsen SoundScan based on each album's weekly physical and digital sales, as well as on-demand streaming and digital sales of their individual tracks.

Starting on the issue dated January 18, 2020, Billboard updated the methodology to compile the chart by incorporating official video data from YouTube, along with visual plays from streaming services like Apple Music, Spotify, Tidal, and Vevo.

Folklore by Taylor Swift was the best-selling album of 2020, and the longest-running number-one album of the year, spending eight weeks atop the chart. Hollywood's Bleeding (2019) by Post Malone was the best-performing album on the Billboard 200 Year-End chart of 2020. In this year, three acts scored two number-one albums each: BTS with Map of the Soul: 7 and Be, YoungBoy Never Broke Again with 38 Baby 2 and Top, and Swift with Folklore and Evermore.

Chart history

See also
 List of Billboard Hot 100 number ones of 2020
 List of Billboard Global 200 number ones of 2020
 2020 in American music

References

2020
United States Albums